Astrebla pectinata, commonly known as barley Mitchell grass, is a herb of the family Poaceae from the order Poales.

Morphology and habitat
Astrebla pectinata grows to 1 m (3.25 ft). The flowers are pollinated by wind and are hermaphrodites, having both male and female organs. It mostly prefers moist soil and also can grow in partial shade.  The species is considered to be the most balanced and economically important herbage in the semiarid areas of eastern Australia. It is a warm-season perennial grass. It is palatable to livestock even when it is dry.

References

Chloridoideae
Flora of Australia
Plants described in 1838
Taxa named by John Lindley